Tage Holmberg (1913–1989) was a Swedish film editor. He also directed two films.

Selected filmography
 The Two of Us (1939)
 Oh, What a Boy! (1939)
Home from Babylon (1941)
 Fransson the Terrible (1941)
 Johansson and Vestman (1946)
 Sunshine Follows Rain (1946)
 It Rains on Our Love (1946)
 A Ship Bound for India (1947)
 Crime in the Sun (1947)
 The Girl from the Marsh Croft (1947)
 Don't Give Up (1947)
 Private Karlsson on Leave (1947)
 Life at Forsbyholm Manor (1948)
 Loffe as a Millionaire (1948)
 Bom the Flyer (1952)
 Hidden in the Fog (1953)

References

Bibliography
 Vermilye, Jerry. Ingmar Bergman: His Life and Films. McFarland, 2002.

External links

1913 births
1989 deaths
Swedish film editors
Swedish film directors
Artists from Stockholm